Pollex oculus is a moth of the family Erebidae first described by Michael Fibiger in 2007. It is known from Balabac in the Philippines.

The wingspan is 8–10 mm. The forewing is narrow and light brown by the medial area, but the rest of the forewing is dark brown. The hindwing is unicolorous dark brown with an indistinct black discal spot and the underside unicolorous dark brown.

References

Micronoctuini
Taxa named by Michael Fibiger
Moths described in 2007